Atlanta United FC is an American professional soccer team based in Atlanta, Georgia that competes in Major League Soccer (MLS).

This is a list of franchise records for Atlanta United, which dates from their inaugural season in 2017 to present.

Honors
 MLS Cup
 Winners: 2018
 Campeones Cup
 Winners: 2019
 Eastern Conference (playoffs)
 Winners: 2018
 U.S. Open Cup
 Winners: 2019

Player records

Most appearances

Goals

Assists

Shutouts

Coaching records

Trophies

List of seasons

Transfer records

Highest transfer fees paid

Highest transfer fees received

International results

By competition
 (Includes CONCACAF Champions League and Campeones Cup)

By club
 (Includes CONCACAF Champions League and Campeones Cup)

By country
 (Includes CONCACAF Champions League and Campeones Cup)

By season

Individual honors

MLS MVP

MLS Best XI

Coach of the Year

Golden Boot

Newcomer of the Year

Rookie of the Year

MLS Cup MVP

All-Star Game MVP

Goal of the Year

Save of the Year

References

Records
Atlanta United
Atlanta United FC records and statistics
Atlanta United FC players